Hawkins Peak is a 10,024-foot-elevation (3,055 meter) mountain summit located in Alpine County, California, United States.

Description
Hawkins Peak is situated in the Sierra Nevada mountain range, with precipitation runoff from the peak draining into tributaries of the West Fork Carson River. The nearest higher neighbor is Stevens Peak,  to the west across Hope Valley.

History
In 1833, Joseph R. Walker's expedition passed through the gap between Hawkins Peak and Markleeville Peak to the south. The United States Geological Survey surveyed this area in 1889 and labelled this geographic feature on their 1893 Markleeville quadrangle map. This landform's toponym has been officially adopted by the U.S. Board on Geographic Names, and has been in Sierra Club publications since at least 1895. The mountain's namesake is John Hawkins, the first white settler in Hot Springs Valley and squatter on a cattle ranch east of the peak, circa 1850s.

Climate
According to the Köppen climate classification system, Hawkins Peak is located in an alpine climate zone. Most weather fronts originate in the Pacific Ocean and travel east toward the Sierra Nevada mountains. As fronts approach, they are forced upward by the peaks (orographic lift), causing them to drop their moisture in the form of rain or snowfall onto the range.

Gallery

See also
 
 Carson Pass

References

External links
 Weather forecast: Hawkins Peak
 NGS Data Sheet
 Hawkins ranch house: photo

North American 3000 m summits
Mountains of Northern California
Mountains of the Sierra Nevada (United States)
Mountains of Alpine County, California
Humboldt–Toiyabe National Forest